Kanggu Zengsheng Wan is a black pill used in Traditional Chinese medicine to "nourish loins and kidney and strengthen the tendons and bones, activate blood circulation and qi flow, and to relieve pain ". It tastes sweet and slightly astringent.

It is used when there are symptoms of “hyperplastic spondylitis, cervical syndrome, or spur”. Each pill weighs about 3 grams, and the dosage varies from about 2-3 gram, two to three times a day.

Chinese classic herbal formula

See also
 Chinese classic herbal formula
 Bu Zhong Yi Qi Wan

References

Traditional Chinese medicine